Kavalam is a village in Kuttanadu, Kerala state, Alappuzha District. India.

Location
Kavalam is located on the borders of Alapuzha and Kottayam districts, on the banks of Vembanad Lake.

Environment
The Pampa river flows through the village to merge into Vembanad Lake. The natural environment has been used as a location by many filmmakers.

The area is interspersed with the kayals (canals) and lakes. The lakes and kayals are filled with flocks of ducks, and in summer the rice paddies of Kuttanad turn golden. With a longtime history behind it, Kavalam is part of Kerala's cultural folklore.

History
A decade back, this village was accessible only by the lake boats provided by the government of Kerala. As in many other remote parts of Kerala, this non-accessibility gave Kavalam a laidback atmosphere. The place is now accessible from Alleppey, Kottayam and Changanacherry by road.  What makes Kavalam unique is its vast "watery junction" that joins five canals at one place unlike other road junctions.

Snake Boat race
The village has a snake boat named Kavalam Chundan, which is a regular participant in the snakeboat Vallamkali  races. Kavalam Chundan is the subject of the legendary film song of the 1960s "Kuttanadan Punchayile Kochu penne, Kuyilaale."

Notable people 
 Kavalam Madhava Panikkar - Diplomat, administrator, historian
 Kavalam Narayana Panicker - Poet, dramatist
 Kavalam Sreekumar - Poet
 Joseph Murickan

References

External links 

 Official website of Alappuzzha District
 From Kavalam to Kavalam

Villages in Alappuzha district